The 2011 World's Strongest Man was the 34th edition of World's Strongest Man and was held on the campus grounds of Wingate University in Wingate, North Carolina, US. The event was sponsored by MET-Rx. The qualifying heats were scheduled for September 15–18, and the finals on September 21 and 22, 2011.

Brian Shaw placed first, 2009 and 2010 champion Zydrunas Savickas placed second, and Terry Hollands placed third.

Line-up

Qualified athletes

Qualifying heats and final

Heat 1

events: loading, car walk, car deadlift, truck pull, dumbbell press, stones

Heat 2

events: loading, keg toss, squat, truck pull, dumbbell press, stones

Heat 3

events: loading, keg toss, car walk, car deadlift, block press, stones

Heat 4

events: loading, keg toss, squat, truck pull, block press, stones

Heat 5

events: loading, keg toss, car walk, car deadlift, block press, stones

Final

Events: Steel Frame Carry, Giant Tyre Walk, Truck Pull, Deadlift, Log Press, Atlas Stones
In the final Mike Jenkins and Ervin Katona were forced to withdraw; unluckily for Jenkins as he had a shot at a podium finish, having won the first 2 events.

Television broadcast

United States
In the US the event was broadcast on ESPN and ESPN2 on Sunday 1 January, with some repeat screenings from 14 January to 5 February.

United Kingdom
In the UK, the show returned on Channel 5 to screen both The Giants Live Tour (the official qualifying tour for The World's Strongest Man) as well as the finals after Bravo screened the show for two years. Giants Live was shown on four consecutive days from 20 December 2011 to 23 December 2011. The finals were broadcast on six consecutive days from 27 December 2011 to 1 January 2012, with each episode dedicated to a qualifying group, and the sixth episode being the final.

References

External links
 Official site

2011 in sports
World's Strongest Man
September 2011 sports events in the United States